Neville Hayes was primarily a defender for the Port Adelaide Football Club and won eight premierships during his career. North Adelaide forward Jeff Pash described Hayes as a "player of all-round gifts who backs his judgement (to a hair-raising extent in this particular case) and plays his man at a distance".

References

Australian rules footballers from South Australia
South Australian Football Hall of Fame inductees
Port Adelaide Football Club (SANFL) players
Port Adelaide Football Club players (all competitions)
Year of birth missing (living people)
Living people